Michael Clarke Duncan (December 10, 1957September 3, 2012) was an American actor and comedian. He was best known for his breakout role as John Coffey in The Green Mile (1999), for which he was nominated for the Academy Award for Best Supporting Actor and other honors, and for playing Kingpin in Daredevil and Spider-Man: The New Animated Series (both 2003). He also appeared in movies such as Armageddon (1998), The Whole Nine Yards (2000), Planet of the Apes (2001), The Scorpion King (2002), Sin City (2005), and Talladega Nights: The Ballad of Ricky Bobby (2006), as well as in the role of Leo Knox in the television series Bones (2011) and its spin-off The Finder (2012). He also had voice roles in films, including Cats & Dogs (2001), Brother Bear (2003), Kung Fu Panda (2008), and Green Lantern (2011); he had the voice role of Benjamin King in the video game Saints Row (2006).

Early life 
Duncan was born in Chicago and raised in a single-parent household with his sister Judy by his mother Jean Duncan (a house cleaner) after his father left. When he was younger, he wanted to play football, and tried out for the Chicago Bears of the National Football League (NFL), but decided to become an actor instead when his mother refused to let him play, fearing he would get injured. He always wanted to act, but had to drop out of the communication program at Alcorn State University to support his family when his mother became ill.

Duncan's large frame— and —helped him in his jobs digging ditches for Peoples Gas Company and being a bouncer at several Chicago clubs. Duncan also played basketball at Kankakee Community College and for one season for the Alcorn State Braves.

In 1979, he participated in the Disco Demolition Night at Comiskey Park, home of the Chicago White Sox, where he was among the first 100 people to run onto the field and he slid into third base. During the ensuing riot, his silver belt buckle was stolen while he was stealing a baseball bat from the dugout.

Career 
Duncan took various security jobs in Los Angeles while trying to get some acting work in commercials. During this time, he worked as a bodyguard for celebrities like Will Smith, Martin Lawrence, Jamie Foxx, LL Cool J, and The Notorious B.I.G., all the while doing bit parts in television and films. When rapper Notorious B.I.G. was killed in 1997, Duncan quit the personal-protection business.

After having begun his career with several bit parts playing bouncers in films such as Bulworth and A Night at the Roxbury, Duncan came to prominence when he was cast as Bear in the blockbuster Michael Bay action film Armageddon (1998). During the production of the film, Duncan became friends with castmate Bruce Willis, and it was Willis' influence that helped him to get his breakout role as gentle giant John Coffey in the Frank Darabont film The Green Mile (1999). Starring with Tom Hanks, Duncan's performance netted him an Academy Award nomination for Best Actor in a Supporting Role and a Golden Globe nomination for Best Performance by an Actor in a Supporting Role in a Motion Picture.

Following his role as Coffey, Duncan was then cast in a string of films that helped to establish him as an actor in both action and comedy roles: The Whole Nine Yards (2000), See Spot Run (2001), Planet of the Apes (2001), The Scorpion King (2002), and Daredevil (2003), and in the latter movie, he played Kingpin.

When Duncan was cast as the Kingpin in 2002, he faced the dual challenge of portraying a typically white character and having to gain  to fit the character's large physique. In July 2006, Duncan showed interest in returning for the role of the Kingpin, but stated that he would not be willing to regain the weight that he had lost. In 2009, he stopped eating meat and later appeared in a PETA ad campaign, touting the health benefits and his increased strength from a vegetarian diet.

In 2005, Duncan appeared in The Island and Sin City, in which he played Manute, a powerful mobster. Critic Roger Ebert praised Duncan for his performance in The Island, writing that "[Duncan] has only three or four scenes, but they're of central importance, and he brings true horror to them." Duncan appeared in a supporting role in the 2006 comedy Talladega Nights: The Ballad of Ricky Bobby as Lucius Washington, and in 2009, he played Balrog in Street Fighter: The Legend of Chun-Li and starred as the titular Cleon "Slammin Salmon in Broken Lizard's farce The Slammin' Salmon.

With his deep, resonant voice, Duncan did voice roles for films such as Brother Bear (2003) and its sequel Brother Bear 2 (2006), Kung Fu Panda (2008), and Green Lantern (2011), playing the voice of Kilowog from DC Comics alongside Ryan Reynolds.

His other voice roles include TV series such as Loonatics Unleashed and Operation: Z.E.R.O., Quiznos commercials, and a number of video games such as Demon Stone, SOCOM II U.S. Navy SEALs, The Suffering: Ties That Bind, Saints Row, Soldier of Fortune, and God of War II, where he provided the voice of the Titan Atlas. He additionally reprised his role as the Kingpin in Spider-Man: The New Animated Series.

In addition to his film roles, Duncan guest-starred in numerous television shows. Two included an episode of The Suite Life of Zack & Cody and a first-season episode of CSI: NY. In 2008, he appeared as Mr. Colt in the second-season premiere of Chuck, "Chuck Versus the First Date" and as a guest star on two episodes of Two and a Half Men. Most notably, in April 2011, Duncan guest-starred on an episode of TV series Bones as Leo Knox which, in 2012, led to Duncan's receiving his first starring role as the same character in the spinoff series The Finder. The Bones Season 8 episode "The Partners in the Divorce", which aired three weeks after his death, was dedicated to him.

During the week of May 14, 2012, Duncan appeared as a guest on the late night talk show The Late Late Show with Craig Ferguson when the show was taping for a week in Scotland. Duncan was one of the show's more frequent guests, appearing a total of 18 times, and, the day after Duncan's death in September, Ferguson began his show with a tribute to him. In January 2013 during The Late Late Shows winter break, reruns of the Scotland episodes were broadcast with a tribute to Duncan at the beginning of each of the five episodes, featuring Duncan’s photo on a pink background and the text "In memory of our friend Michael Clarke Duncan."

Personal life 
At the time of his death, Duncan was dating reality television personality Omarosa Manigault. His family later claimed that Omarosa changed his will and testament. They also claimed that Omarosa manipulated Duncan in his final days, lied about their engagement, and sold his belongings without the family's knowledge. In 2013, Manigault appeared in the cast of The All-Star Celebrity Apprentice and played in Duncan's honor for his favorite charity and one he had benefited from himself, the Sue Duncan Children's Center. In episode two of the season, Manigault won $40,000 for the charity.

Duncan trained in Brazilian jiu-jitsu at the Gracie Academy in Torrance, California and held a purple belt in the discipline.

Death 

Duncan was taken to Cedars Sinai Medical Center after suffering a heart attack on July 13, 2012. By August 6, he had been moved from the intensive care unit but remained hospitalized. On September 3, Duncan died in the hospital from respiratory failure. He was 54.

On September 10, 2012, a private funeral was held for Duncan in Los Angeles. He was interred at Forest Lawn Memorial Park, Hollywood Hills.

Filmography

Films

Television

Video games

Music videos

References

External links 

 
 
 

1957 births
2012 deaths
20th-century American male actors
21st-century American male actors
African-American basketball players
African-American male actors
African-American players of American football
Alcorn State Braves basketball players
American male film actors
American male television actors
American male video game actors
American male voice actors
American men's basketball players
American practitioners of Brazilian jiu-jitsu
Basketball players from Chicago
Bodyguards
Burials at Forest Lawn Memorial Park (Hollywood Hills)
Male actors from Chicago
Players of American football from Chicago